Sir Nicholas Bacon, 1st Baronet (1623–1666) was an English lawyer, and one of the Bacon baronets. On 18 June 1639, he was admitted to Gray's Inn. On 7 February 1662, he was created 1st Baronet Bacon, of Gillingham in Norfolk, England.

His father, Nicholas Bacon of Gillingham, was the fifth son of Sir Nicholas Bacon, 1st Baronet, of Redgrave; his mother was Nicholas Bacon's second wife, Margaret D'Arcy. He married Elizabeth Freeston.

References

External links
'Clavering Hundred: Gillingham', An Essay towards a Topographical History of the County of Norfolk: volume 8, pp. 9–13. URL: http://www.british-history.ac.uk/report.aspx?compid=78394 Date accessed: 23 July 2010.

1623 births
1666 deaths
Baronets in the Baronetage of England
People from South Norfolk (district)